Gasable is an online gas delivery app in Jordan. The app is the first to enable consumers to order gas cylinders online. It was launched in 2016, and is available on the iOS App Store and the Google Play Store.

References 

Mobile applications